Tyrese Sinclair (born 4 February 2001) is an English professional footballer who plays as an attacking midfielder for Altrincham on loan from Rochdale.

Career

Mansfield Town
Sinclair was released by Blackburn Rovers in 2017, and took part in a EFL trial day in February 2017. He later signed for Mansfield Town, where he was their 2018–19 youth Player of the Year, and where he turned professional in July 2019. He made his senior debut on 27 August 2019 in a Football League Trophy game against Everton U21s. Later that month he moved on loan to non-league club Radcliffe, where his father worked as assistant manager. In January 2020 he moved on loan to Basford United.

He scored his first goal for Mansfield on 9 April 2021.

He moved on loan to Scunthorpe United in January 2022.

Sinclair was released by Mansfield Town at the end of the 2021–22 season.

Rochdale
On 19 July 2022, Sinclair joined Rochdale on a two-year deal following a successful trial period.

On 2 February 2023, Sinclair signed for National League club Altrincham on loan until the end of the season.

Personal life
His father is the retired Jamaican international footballer Frank Sinclair.

Career statistics

References

2001 births
Living people
Footballers from Kingston upon Thames
English footballers
Association football midfielders
English people of Jamaican descent
Blackburn Rovers F.C. players
Mansfield Town F.C. players
Radcliffe F.C. players
Basford United F.C. players
Scunthorpe United F.C. players
Rochdale A.F.C. players
Altrincham F.C. players
English Football League players
Northern Premier League players
National League (English football) players